Never Take No for an Answer (also known as Peppino e Violetta and The Small Miracle) is a 1950 Italian film directed by Maurice Cloche

Cast
Roberto Adamina – Gianni
Nerio Bernardi – Father Superior
Guido Celano – Strotti
Frank Coulson – Doctor Bartolo
Arnoldo Foà
Vittorio Manunta – Peppino
John Murphy – Father O'Brien
Denis O'Dea – Father Damico

See also
Never Take No for an Answer (1951)

External links
 

1950 films
Films scored by Nino Rota
1950s Italian-language films
Italian multilingual films
Films directed by Maurice Cloche
1950s multilingual films
Italian black-and-white films
1950s Italian films